Life Is Sweet is the third album by American singer-songwriter Maria McKee, released in 1996.

Critical reception
Trouser Press wrote that the album "goes straight over the top in a bewildering styleless hodgepodge of bad production ideas, bizarre gimmicks (paraphrasing melodies and rhythm guitar sounds from Ziggy Stardust?), uneven writing and singing so mindlessly zealous in spots that McKee can’t possibly be hearing herself." The Washington Post thought that "McKee's songs are sometimes swamped by the ornate arrangements, but her wide-ranging vocals are consistently expressive."

Track listing
All songs by Maria McKee, except where noted

 "Scarlover" – 5:16
 "This Perfect Dress" – 4:26
 "Absolutely Barking Stars" – 4:23
 "I'm Not Listening" (Bruce Brody, McKee, David Nolte) – 4:02
 "Everybody" – 4:17
 "Smarter" – 3:13
 "What Else You Wanna Know" – 5:23
 "I'm Awake" – 3:51
 "Human" – 4:17
 "Carried" (McKee, Nolte) – 4:42
 "Life Is Sweet" – 4:06
 "Afterlife" (Brody, McKee) – 2:38

Personnel
 Maria McKee – guitar, vocals, producer, mixing, arranging
 Bruce Brody – piano, conductor, Hammond organ, Moog synthesizer, producer, mixing, arranging
 Ric Kavin – percussion, drums
 David Nolte – bass guitar, guitar
 Susan Otten – percussion, vocals
 Martin Tillman – orchestra
 Mark Freegard – producer, audio engineer, mixing
 Bob Salcedo – assistant engineer
 John Aguto – mixing assistant
 Mike Baumgartner – mixing assistant
 Bob Ludwig – mastering
 Janet Wolsborn – art direction
 David Mayenfisch – photography

Charts

References

Maria McKee albums
1996 albums
Geffen Records albums